Stefano Tofanelli (September 26, 1752 - November 30, 1812) was an Italian painter during the Neoclassic period.

Life
He was born in Nave, near Lucca, and as a young boy of ten he was apprenticed with the painter Giuseppe Antonio Luchi, also called il Diecimino, who was a follower of the rococo style of Giovanni Battista Tiepolo. With his fellow apprentice  Bernardino Nocchi, then moved to Rome in 1768, where they both worked with Niccolò Lapiccola. In Rome with Nocchi he painted frescoes for the Palazzo of the Cardinal Dropanni.

He was employed by engravers to make drawings for them, and, for example, for Volpato, he drew Parnassus by Raphael and a Sibyl and two Prophets by Michelangelo, Martyrdom by Guido Reni, Aurora  and Day & Night by Guercino, and a Landscape by Claude Lorraine. For the artist Morghen, he completed a drawing of Poussin's Dance of the Hours, of Raphael's Jurisprudence, Transfiguration, and Miracle of Bolsena; and of Murillo's Magdalene. He also worked for Bettelini, Fontana, and Giovanni Folo. Tofanelli also painted altarpieces, portraits, and mythological scenes. In 1781 he opened an Art School in Rome, but afterwards returned to Lucca, and in 1802 became Professor of Drawing in the University of San Frediano. Among his pupils was Michele Ridolfi.  He died in Lucca, aged 60.

References

1752 births
1812 deaths
18th-century Italian painters
Italian male painters
19th-century Italian painters
Italian printmakers
Painters from Lucca
Fresco painters
19th-century Italian male artists
18th-century Italian male artists